Shaheed Nirmal Mahto Medical College is a medical school currently in Dhanbad, Jharkhand. It was established in 1971 under private management as Patliputra Medical College at Ashok Raj Path, Patna. The government of Bihar transferred the college to Dhanbad and attached Sadar Hospital, expanded the campus, added SSLNT hospital Purana Bazaar Dhanbad, and Central Hospital Jagjeevan Nagar Dhanbad to the school.

The medical college and hospital expanded onto  of land in Saraidhela, Dhanbad. Buildings were constructed for the medical college (functional from 1977) and hospital (functional from 2001 to 2002) with a capacity of 900 beds.

The hospital at Saraidhela campus contains all clinical departments except surgery and orthopedics which occupy the old building at Sadar.

The annual enrollment into M.B.B.S courses has been 50 since 1977. 

The college has facilities for paramedical training courses in different streams. The hospital provides medical facilities to about 1000 OPD patients per day who come from adjoining districts and states.

References

External links
 Official Website

Colleges affiliated to Vinoba Bhave University
Medical colleges in Jharkhand
Education in Dhanbad
Educational institutions established in 1971
1971 establishments in Bihar
Universities and colleges in Jharkhand
Hospitals established in 2002